Jack Marks may refer to:
Jack Marks (performer) (1895–1987), English performer and screenwriter
Jack Marks (ice hockey) (1882–1945), Canadian ice hockey player
Jack Marks (police officer) (1927–2007), Canadian police officer
Jack Marks (politician) (1924–1998), Australian politician and trade union official

See also
John Marks (disambiguation)